The 2022 Sonsio Grand Prix at Road America was the eighth round of the 2022 IndyCar season. The race was held on June 12, 2022, in Elkhart Lake, Wisconsin at Road America. The race consisted of 55 laps and was won by Josef Newgarden.

Entry list

Practice

Practice 1

Practice 2

Qualifying

Qualifying classification 

 Notes
 Bold text indicates fastest time set in session.

Final Practice

Race 
The race started at 12:55 PM ET on June 12, 2022.

Race classification

Championship standings after the race 

Drivers' Championship standings

Engine manufacturer standings

 Note: Only the top five positions are included.

References

Champ Car Grand Prix of Road America
Sonsio Grand Prix of Road America
Sonsio Grand Prix of Road America
Sonsio Grand Prix of Road America